Jonáš Forejtek and Dalibor Svrčina won the boys' doubles tennis title at the 2019 Australian Open, defeating Cannon Kingsley and Emilio Nava in the final, 7–6(7–5), 6–4.

Hugo Gaston and Clément Tabur were the defending champions, but both players were no longer eligible to participate in junior tournaments.

Seeds

Draw

Finals

Top half

Bottom half

References
 Main Draw

Boys' Doubles
2019